Fitzy and Wippa with Kate Ritchie is an Australian breakfast radio show on Nova 96.9 in Sydney, Australia. It is hosted by comedians Ryan "Fitzy" Fitzgerald, Michael "Wippa" Wipfli and Kate Ritchie. 

The show airs from 6 am to 9 am on weekday mornings with music and daily topic discussions and special guests. A daily podcast featuring the best bits from each show is available on iTunes as is the podcast for all other Nova FM Breakfast and Drive shows in Australia.

News, sport, weather and traffic updates are presented by Matt de Groot.

The show also features rap battle with celebrities.

History
The show commenced broadcasting on 17 January 2011, replacing Ryan, Monty and Wippa on the drive shift. Ryan Shelton left Nova to focus on his television career and Katie "Monty" Dimond moved to Sydney to join Merrick Watts and Scott Dooley at Nova 96.9 on the breakfast show.

In August 2011, it was announced that Fitzy & Wippa would move to Nova 96.9 breakfast and replacing Merrick Watts and Scott Dooley. Meshel, Tim and Marty (now Kate, Tim and Marty) took over the national drive show.

Aside from the Nova Network the show is also syndicated to 38 other FM stations including Ace Radio and Grant Broadcasters FM Network of stations along with Red FM, Eagle FM and Snow FM. The time of day that Fitzy & Wippa is broadcast is different for each of these stations and they will shorten it to 1 hour or 2-hour long episodes featuring the best bits only.

In January 2018, Sarah McGilvray joined the show after previously making regular appearances in her role as Nova 96.9 program director. In October 2019, Executive Producer Tom Ivey, who also makes on-air contributions as part of the broader team was officially recognised in promotions.  

In March 2023, it was reported that McGilvray had been dropped from the show. After weeks of speculation, Nova announced that Kate Ritchie will join the show permanently from 14 March 2023.

Television special
On 27 November 2015, Fitzy and Wippa hosted a one-off special Up Reasonably Late with Fitzy & Wippa on Network Ten. It was watched by 114,000 viewers.

References

External links
Fitzy and Wippa with Kate Ritchie

Australian radio programs
2010s Australian radio programs
2020s Australian radio programs